Britt Inger Liselott "Lotta" Lotass Hagström (born 28 February 1964) is a Swedish writer. She holds a PhD of Comparative literature from the University of Gothenburg, and lives in Gothenburg, Sweden.

Lotass made her literary debut in 2000, and two years later published her doctoral dissertation on Swedish writer Stig Dagerman. On 6 March 2009, Lotass was officially announced to succeed late Sten Rudholm at Seat No.1 at the Swedish Academy. Lotass took her seat on the 18-member assembly on 20 December 2009.

In an interview in November 2017, Lotass said that she considered herself an inactive member and that she had not had any contact with the Swedish Academy since September 2016. She formally resigned in May 2018.

Bibliography
 Kallkällan (2000)
 Aerodynamiska tal (2001)
 Friheten meddelad. Studier i Stig Dagermans författarskap (2002)
 Band II Från Gabbro till Löväng (2002)
 Tredje flykthastigheten (2004)
 skymning:gryning (2005)
 Samlarna (2005)
 Min röst skall nu komma från en annan plats i rummet (2006)
 Den vita jorden (2007)
 Arkipelag. Hörspel (2007)
 Dalén (2008)
 Den röda himlen (2008)
 Redwood (2008)
 Hemvist (2009)
 Sten Rudholm : inträdestal i Svenska akademien (2009)
 Speleologerna (2009)
 Den svarta solen (2009)
 Kraftverk (2009)
 Klar himmel (2010)
 Sparta (2010)
 Fjärrskrift (2011)
 Nya dikter (2011)
 Konungarnas tillbedjan (2012)
 Everest (2012)
 Mars (2013)
 Varia (2014)
 Örnen (2014)

Various plays
 Samlarna (2005)
 Dalén (2008)
 Klar himmel (2010)
 Everest (2012)

References

1964 births
Living people
People from Gagnef Municipality
University of Gothenburg alumni
Members of the Swedish Academy
Swedish women dramatists and playwrights
21st-century Swedish dramatists and playwrights